Li Ya (born June 13, 1988 in Bengbu, Anhui) is a former Chinese gymnast. She was a member of the Chinese team that won the team competition at the 2006 World Championships and competed in the World Championships in Anaheim and was also a member of the 2004 Olympic Team. During her career, she was an uneven bars and balance beam specialist.

Li Ya has two moves named after her in the Code of Points: the "Li Ya salto", which is a straddled Jaeger ½ release (which she usually connected to a straddled Jaeger), and the "Li Ya dismount", which is an Arabian double-front in a piked position. Li retired from the national team in 2008.

Biography
Li Ya is the 2004 National Champion on the uneven bars as well as the 2004 National All Around Silver Medalist. She had a great deal of success in the 2004 World Cup Circuit despite a bad showing at the 2004 Olympics. In the team final in the 2004 Summer Olympics in Athens she fell twice on beam scoring an 8.300 (once on her front flip and then underrotated on her double back dismount and put her hands down). Then in the event finals, she fell again on her front flip and scored a 9.050 (ranking 7th).  She won the uneven bars title at the Glasgow and Ghent World Cup Qualifiers. She also won a bronze medal at the 2004 Glasgow World Cup Qualifier. In December 2004 Li Ya qualified to the World Cup Final in Birmingham. She was the most successful Chinese female gymnast at the World Cup Final. She won a bronze medal on the uneven bars and a silver medal on the balance beam.

Li was briefly injured in 2005, but recovered in time to win silver medals at the 2005 Chinese National Championships and the 2005 Britain vs China Dual Meet on the uneven bars. In October, she competed at the National Games but did not win any medals.  A few weeks later, she was part of China's winning team at the East Asia Games in Macau, where she also won a gold medal on the uneven bars. She was not selected for the 2005 World Championships in Melbourne.

She competed in the 2006 Tournament of Masters in Cottbus, a world cup event, and won the gold medal on the uneven bars. In this event, she pioneered a difficult release-release combination, a Jaeger with a half turn directly into a Jaeger. The Jaegar with 1/2 turn release was later named for her. Li also qualified for the beam final and finished in fourth place, due to a mistake on her first skill.

She competed at the 2006 World Championships in Aarhus, Denmark where she was a member of the Chinese team that won the gold medal in the women's team event. She did not compete in the team final, having withdrawn from the uneven bars due to nerves sustained from a performance marred by a fall in the preliminary competition.

After this competition, Li Ya did not receive positive coverage from the press in China and was not named to the team for the 2006 Asian Games in Doha, Qatar. However, she had one more chance, having qualified for bars and beam in the World Cup Finals in Brazil, held in December. She hit her routines at this competition, winning silver on bars behind world champion Beth Tweddle, and winning gold on the balance beam.

In 2007, Li Ya competed in the Maribor World Cup where she placed 2nd on balance beam and 1st on the uneven bars.

She announced her retirement in 2008.

Eponymous Skills

Competitive history

2007 season

2006 season

2004 season

2003 season

Floor Music
2004-2006 "Duel" by Bond

References

External links
 
 

1988 births
Living people
Chinese female artistic gymnasts
Gymnasts at the 2004 Summer Olympics
Medalists at the World Artistic Gymnastics Championships
Olympic gymnasts of China
Originators of elements in artistic gymnastics
People from Bengbu
Gymnasts from Anhui